Marco Pfeuti (born 1968 in Oppligen near Thun), better known by his stage name Gölä, is a popular Swiss rock musician performing mainly in Bernese German.

Career

The debut album of Gölä's eponymous band Uf u dervo (1998) sold 250,000 copies, acquiring quintuple platinum status as one of Switzerland's most successful Swiss German music albums. Up until their disbandment in 2002, Gölä and his band produced four more albums, selling over half a million CDs and playing to sold-out concert halls.

A 2004 relaunch of the band as Burn with English-language songs was less successful.

Discography
 Uf u dervo (1998)
 Wildi Ross (1999)
 Volksmusig (2 CD, 2000)
 Gölä III (2001)
 Gölä III – Live02 (2002)
 Burn (2004)
 Gimme a Band (2005)
 Rock & Roll (2007)
 Tättoo – Best of Bärndütsch / So Damn Sexy (2 CD, 2008)
 Z’Läbe fägt (2008)
 Z’Läbe fägt – Platinum Tour Edition 09 (2 CD, 2009)
 The Greatest Hits Sessions (feat. The Bellamy Brothers, 2010)
 BB&G Platinum (The Bellamy Brothers feat. Gölä, 2011)
 100% Mundart Stadion Thun (CD + DVD, 2011)
 Ängu u Dämone 1 / 2 (2 CD, 2012)
 Die schönsten Mundart-Balladen – Nashville-Aufnahmen (2014)
 Mermaid Cowgirl (The Bellamy Brothers feat. Gölä, 2014)
 Stärne (2016)
 Urchig (2017)
 20 Jahre Bühnenjubiläum – Hallenstadion 2018 (2 CD + DVD 2018)
 Büetzer Buebe (feat. Trauffer, 2019)

External links
 Official website

References

1968 births
Living people
People from the canton of Bern
Swiss rock musicians
World Music Awards winners
20th-century Swiss musicians
21st-century Swiss musicians